Satapar is a village in Rajkot  district, Gujarat, India.

Total infected patients are 45 in Rajkot District and total population of Rajkot District is 360330. Total Infected Patients in Gujarat State are 1041.

Locality Name : Satapar ( સતાપર )

Taluka Name : Kotda Sangani

District : Rajkot District

State : Gujarat

Language : Gujarati and Hindi

Time zone: IST (UTC+5:30)

Elevation / Altitude: 196 meters. Above Sea level

Telephone Code / Std Code: 02827

Villages in Rajkot district